Pierre-Louis Couperin (14 March 1755 – 10 October 1789) was a French organist and composer, a member of the famous Couperin dynasty of composer-organists.

Life 
Like his brother Gervais-François, Pierre-Louis Couperin studied with his father Armand-Louis Couperin. On 19 April 1773, the board of Saint-Gervais-Saint-Protais appointed him as successor of his father. Pierre-Louis Couperin occupied the traditional family positions: he was an organist at Notre-Dame de Paris, where his brother succeeded him, but also at Saint-Gervais, Saint-Jean-en-Grève, the Carmes-Billettes and the Chapelle royale.

Pierre-Louis Couperin died shortly after his father and was buried with him in the Saint-Gervais church in the chapel de la Providence.

Compositions 
Romances for harpsichord
1782: Air de Malbrough mis en variations
1784: Allegro
1784: Air de Tibulle et d'Élie
1787: Romance de Nina mise en variations pour le clavecin, ou piano-forte

Bibliography 
Anthony, James R. (1997), French Baroque Music from Beaujoyeulx to Rameau, Portland, Amadeus Press
Beausant, Philippe (1980), François Couperin, Paris, Fayard 
Benoit, Marcelle (rep.) (1992), Dictionnaire de la musique en France aux XVII et XVIIIe siècles, Paris, Fayard

See also 
 Couperin family

References

External links 
 
 Lettre autographe signée de Pierre-Louis (?) Couperin fils on Gallica
 COUPERIN, Pierre Louis (1755-1789) on cmbv.fr
 Couperin Pierre-Louis on Musicology.org

18th-century French people
French classical organists
French male organists
1755 births
1789 deaths
Male classical organists